The 1972 World Karate Championships are the 2nd edition of the World Karate Championships, and were held in Stade Pierre de Coubertin, Paris, France on April 21 and April 22, 1972.

Medalists

Medal table

References

 Results
 Results

External links
 World Karate Federation

World Championships
World Karate Championships
World Karate Championships
Karate Championships
1972 in Paris
Karate competitions in France
April 1972 sports events in Europe